Polydora is a genus of annelid worms. It contains marine polychaete species that live in mud, holes bored in rocks, and holes bored in the shells of shellfish.

Some shell- and rock-boring polydora worms leave a characteristic double hole in the rock and shells in which they burrow.

Etymology 
From the Ancient Greek  Πολυδωρη, from Polydora, daughter of Tethys and Ocean in Greek mythology.

Economic effects
Polydora species are a major economic issue for parts of the shellfish industry. Some species cause "mudblister" on oysters, living inside the oyster shell and roughening its interior surface. Although this makes the oyster grow much more slowly, and makes the shell ugly and harder to sell, the meat of the oyster is still fit to eat.

List of Polydora species 
 Polydora aciculata
 Polydora aggregata
 Polydora anoculata
 Polydora armata Langerhans, 1880
 Polydora barbilla
 Polydora bioccipitalis
 Polydora blakei
 Polydora brachycephala
 Polydora caeca
 Polydora cardalia
 Polydora caulleryi
 Polydora ciliata
 Polydora cirrosa
 Polydora colonia Moore
 Polydora commensalis Andrews
 Polydora concharum
 Polydora convexa
 Polydora cornuta Bosc, 1802
 Polydora elegantissima
 Polydora flava Claparede, 1870
 Polydora giardi
 Polydora glycymerica Radashevsky, 1993
 Polydora gracilis
 Polydora hartmanae
 Polydora haswelli
 Polydora hermaphroditica Hannerz, 1956
 Polydora heterochaeta
 Polydora hoplura Claparede, 1870
 Polydora kaneohe Ward, 1981
 Polydora latispinosa
 Polydora ligni Webster
 Polydora limicola
 Polydora magna
 Polydora narica
 Polydora neocardalia
 Polydora notialis
 Polydora nuchalis
 Polydora pilikia Ward, 1981
 Polydora pilocollaris
 Polydora posthamata Jones, 1962
 Polydora protuberata
 Polydora pygidialis
 Polydora quadrilobata Jacobi
 Polydora socialis (Schmarda)
 Polydora spongicola
 Polydora tentaculata
 Polydora tetrabranchia
 Polydora tridenticulata Woodwick, 1964
 Polydora websteri Hartman, 1943
 Polydora woodwicki

References

External links

 Myers, P., R. Espinosa, C. S. Parr, T. Jones, G. S. Hammond, and T. A. Dewey. 2015. The Animal Diversity Web (online). Polydora

Polychaete genera
Aquaculture